Sunnyside Records is an American jazz record company and label established by François Zalacain in 1982 initially to release an album by pianist Harold Danko. Albums by Kirk Lightsey and Lee Konitz soon followed beginning a sequence of releases covering a cross-section of jazz, blues classical and world musics.

Discography

1000 Series

3000 Series

3500 Series: OWL Records

3600 Series: Sunnyside Café

4000 Series

4100 Series

4500 Series

4600 Series

4700 Series

References

Barry Kernfeld, "Sunnyside". Grove Jazz online.

External links
 Official site

American record labels
Jazz record labels